"In My Mind" is a song by the Swedish electronic dance music duo Antiloop. It was released on 31 March 1997 by Stockholm Records and Fluid Records in Sweden, and Polydor Records in Europe, as the lead single from their debut studio album, LP (1997). It's the duo's most successful single, reaching number four in Norway and selling over 200 000 copies in France.

It won a Swedish Dance Music Awards for "Best Dance Single" in February 1998.

Composition
The ambient intro in the beginning is taken from "Hold That Sucker Down (Builds Like a Skyscraper)" (1994) by The O.T. Quartet, real name Rollo Armstrong, famous for one of the founding member of the electronic music group Faithless.

The text "In My Mind", which is also the only text in the song, is taken from "Warehouse (Days of Glory)" (1989) by New Deep Societys.

Music video
The video is black and white, except for the parts that are blue. A girl is walking on the streets in Stockholm wearing sunglasses and headphones. The duo Antiloop themselves make a cameo through her sunglasses with one on each of the lens.

Appearances in other media
 The Swedish film Sherdil (1999) by Gita Mallik.
 The video game FIFA Football 2003 (2002).

Track listing

12-inch single

CD single

Charts

Weekly charts

Year-end charts

Certifications and sales

References

External links
 "In My Mind" at Discogs
 "In My Mind" at MusicBrainz

1997 singles
1997 songs
Trance songs